Flashback is a 1969 Italian drama film directed by Raffaele Andreassi. The film received many awards; Globo d'oro, Grolla Silver premium (Saint Vincent), Award of Tourism & Entertainment and  Silverstar Festival San Francisco. It was entered into the 1969 Cannes Film Festival and was nominated for the Golden Palm. At the festival the film received standing ovations.

Plot
In September 1944, Heinz Prulier (Fred Robsahm) is a German soldier stationed as a sniper overlooking his own army from a tree. When he falls asleep, his troops are gone and he is left alone to defend the incoming enemy invasion. Flashbacks recall his wartime experiences and his transition from a human being into a sadistic murderer and rapist. He encounters a prostitute and a giggling girl in this violent feature that reveals the deterioration of human values in the face of the grim realities of war.

Cast
 Fred Robsahm 
 Pilar Castel
 Dada Gallotti
 Sandra Dal Sasso
 Gianni Cavina
 Antonietta Fiorito
 Pietro Bonfiglioli
 Gabriele Fornacioni
 Vittorio Gobbi

Awards
 Golden Globe's Foreign Press
 Grolla Silver premium (St. Vincent)
 Award of Tourism and Entertainment
 Silverstar Festival San Francisco

References

External links

1969 films
1969 drama films
Films set in 1944
Italian drama films
1960s Italian-language films
Films scored by Bruno Nicolai
Italian World War II films
Films about Nazi Germany
1960s Italian films